Václav Pavlis (7 March 1930 – 24 December 2007) was a football goalkeeper from Czechoslovakia. He was a member of the national team.

Pavlis started his football career at Bohemians Prague. In 1951 he began his military service at Dukla Prague and stayed there even after end of his compulsory service, until the end of his career. He won the Czechoslovak First League with Dukla seven times, in 1953, 1956, 1958, 1961, 1962, 1963 and 1964.

After finishing his active career he coached goalkeepers at Dukla Prague.

Footnotes

References
 Profile

1930 births
2007 deaths
Association football goalkeepers
Czech footballers
Czechoslovak footballers
Czechoslovakia international footballers
Dukla Prague footballers
Footballers from Prague